Ted Stevens Anchorage International Airport  is a major airport in the U.S. state of Alaska, located  southwest of downtown Anchorage. The airport is named for Ted Stevens, a U.S. senator from Alaska in office from 1968 to 2009. It is included in the Federal Aviation Administration (FAA) National Plan of Integrated Airport Systems for 2017–2021, in which it is categorized as a medium-hub primary commercial service facility.

History
Built in 1951, the airport was served in the 1950s by Alaska Airlines, Northwest Orient, Pacific Northern Airlines and Reeve Aleutian Airways, using aircraft ranging from Douglas DC-3s to Boeing 377s, and was also a refueling stop for Canadian Pacific Air Lines service to the Far East (one such aircraft being involved in a 1951 disappearance). From 1955 to 2011, the eastern end of the airport's southernmost runway connected to the Kulis Air National Guard Base.

By the mid-1980s the airport's nickname was "Crossroads of the World". Anchorage was a common stopover for passengers flying between Europe and East Asia, because airspace in China, the Soviet Union and Eastern Bloc countries were off-limits and because the first generation of jets and widebody airliners did not have the range to fly non-stop across the Pacific Ocean. Carriers using Anchorage for this purpose included:

 Northwest Orient, the first airline to operate scheduled trans-Pacific service after World War II, used Elmendorf Field and later Anchorage International as a stopover for service between US points (Seattle, Chicago and Minneapolis at various times) and Tokyo as late as the mid-1970s.
 Scandinavian Airlines (SAS) began a transpolar flight from Copenhagen to Tokyo via Anchorage on 24 February 1957.  A timetable from 11/25/88 - 3/25/89 shows SAS Flight 989 operated to Anchorage from Copenhagen on Wednesday, Friday & Sunday.  Dep: 3:40PM, Arr: 2:40PM.  It left at 3:20PM and arrived at 4:55pm+1 in Tokyo.
 Japan Airlines served Seattle through Anchorage in the early 1960s, and offered service through Anchorage to London, Paris, Amsterdam, Copenhagen, Düsseldorf, Hamburg, New York City & São Paulo from the 1960s until October 1991.  Last JAL flight was JL438 on 31 October 1991, Paris(Charles de Gaulle) - Anchorage - Tokyo(Narita).
 Air France, British Airways, Iberia, KLM, Lufthansa, Sabena, Swissair and Spantax all used Anchorage as a stopover point between Europe and the Far East of Asia into the 1980s to 1991. 
 Korean Air used Anchorage as a stopover point for flights between Seoul and both Europe and the continental US in the 1980s. On September 1, 1983, one of these flights, Flight 007 was shot down by a Soviet pilot who had mistaken it for a spy plane, after unintentionally violating Soviet airspace.

In the mid-1980s airport officials knew that the then-new Boeing 747-400, with a longer range than then-existing aircraft, would decrease stopovers. They did not expect that Mikhail Gorbachev's glasnost, towards the end of the Cold War, would open Soviet airspace to flights, causing the decrease to occur sooner than planned. By 1988, 16 airline flights that had previously stopped in Anchorage—each bringing almost $80,000 in revenue to the state—instead flew nonstop over Siberia.

Most scheduled passenger service from Anchorage to Europe and Asia ceased in the early 1990s. Korean Air continued to serve Anchorage 3 times a week on a yearly scheduled basis until March 2005 and reduced to 3 times a week for the summer season only in 2006. China Airlines, the last Asian carrier to serve Anchorage on a regular basis, used Anchorage as an intermediate stop on its Taipei-New York route until 2011, when it rerouted these flights to stop in Osaka. While a few charter passenger aircraft still stop at Anchorage on flights between Asia and the eastern United States, scheduled cargo carriers – which benefit from more volume and thus shorter route segments – continue to use Anchorage frequently. Condor still uses the Frankfurt-Anchorage route on a Boeing 767.

In the 1990s, Alaska Airlines and Aeroflot operated services from Anchorage to several destinations in the Russian Far East, including Khabarovsk, Magadan, Petropavlovsk, Vladivostok and Yuzhno-Sakhalinsk. Alaska Airlines pulled out of these markets in 1998 due to insufficient demand, while the Aeroflot services were primarily intended as technical stops en route to Seattle and San Francisco and were cancelled once newer aircraft and nonstop flights became available. Reeve Aleutian Airways, Dalavia and MAVIAL Magadan Airlines also offered service between Anchorage and the Russian Far East at various times, catering to Kamchatka oil exploration and other niche markets.

The airport was renamed in 2000 by the Alaska Legislature to honor then long-standing U.S. Senator Ted Stevens. Stevens survived a crash at the airport in 1978 that also killed his then-wife.

In October 2018, Alaska Governor Bill Walker and Heilongjiang Province Governor Wang Wentao announced plans to connect Anchorage and Harbin Taiping International Airport with year-round, nonstop flights as early as the summer of 2019.

On November 30, 2018, the airport suffered minor damage and was temporarily closed following a magnitude 7.0 earthquake in the area. In June 2019, American Airlines switched the Boeing 737-800 on their seasonal route to Phoenix with the Airbus A321neo making them the first airline to use the A321neo at Anchorage. In January 2023, Delta replaced their Boeing 737-900 and 757-200 in favor of the A321neo for their route to Minneapolis-St. Paul.

During the COVID-19 pandemic, the airport was briefly the busiest in the United States due to sustained volume of cargo flights through Alaska while passenger travel sharply decreased at other American airports.

Passenger traffic

Ted Stevens Anchorage International Airport's passenger traffic hovered around the five million mark between 1998 and 2008, apart from in 2002 when the airport suffered a 13% drop in traffic. Fairbanks and Juneau are the next busiest airports though neither managed more than half a million passengers in 2007. Anchorage traffic peaks in June, July and August when passenger numbers are twice as high as between October and April. Most major U.S. passenger carriers serve ANC, with the majority of passenger flight operations by Alaska Airlines to and from Seattle (an average of 20 flights per day) and Fairbanks (5-7 flights per day).

Anchorage is also envisioned as a future connecting point for air traffic to the Russian Far East. During the summer season of 2008, there was one weekly flight to Russia by Vladivostok Air. Yakutia Airlines resumed summer seasonal service to Russia in 2012. Many of Alaska's North Slope workers live either in Anchorage or elsewhere in the Lower 48 states and fly through the airport to their jobs in Prudhoe Bay.

As per Federal Aviation Administration records, the airport had 2,599,313 passenger boardings (enplanements) in calendar year 2008, 2,282,666 enplanements in 2009, and 2,342,310 in 2010.

Nearest international airport from anchorage are Fairbanks International Airport
Juneau International Airport. Fairbanks International Airport are the second most busiest airport in Alaska.

International cargo hub
Ted Stevens Anchorage International Airport is a major cargo hub. In 2020, it ranked as the United States' second-busiest airport and the world's fourth-busiest airport by cargo traffic. Cargo aircraft between China or Japan and the US prefer to refuel on the way to carry less fuel and more cargo, so the opening of Russian airspace had little effect on such flights' use of Anchorage.

FedEx Express and UPS Airlines operate major hubs at Anchorage International for cargo heading to and from the Far East. NWA Cargo used to operate a major hub at the airport until December 28, 2009, when it closed all operations for Northwest Cargo at all airports. FedEx Express is the airport's largest cargo facility and can handle as many as 13,400 packages per hour, employing more than 1,200 people and providing a full customs clearance system. United Parcel Service's hub handles about 5,000 parcels per hour. Both companies forecast a large growth in traffic over the next several years as trade with China and other Far East countries increases and plan to expand their Anchorage facilities comparatively. The United States Postal Service also operates a large sectional center facility (SCF) for the 995xx ZIP Codes. It processes mail and parcels headed to and from all Alaska cities.

The United States Department of Transportation allows Anchorage and other Alaskan airports to be used as a transfer point for cargo between different aircraft of the same foreign air carrier without applying for special permission, a privilege not available at airports in the contiguous US. In 2020, the airport applied for similar authority for passenger traffic, which would potentially allow foreign airlines to use Anchorage as a connecting hub for international passengers. A similar exemption was previously granted to airports in Puerto Rico.

Facilities and aircraft

Ted Stevens Anchorage International Airport covers an area of 4,608 acres (1,865 ha) at an elevation of 151 feet (46 m) above mean sea level. It has three runways: 7L/25R is 10,600 by 150 feet (3,231 x 46 m) with an asphalt surface; 7R/25L is 12,400 by 200 feet (3,780 x 61 m) with an asphalt/concrete surface; 15/33 is 10,865 by 200 feet (3,312 x 61 m) with an asphalt surface. The airport also has one asphalt helipad that is 100 by 100 feet (30 x 30 m).

For the 12-month period ending April 30, 2019, the airport had 261,961 aircraft operations, an average of 718 per day: 38% scheduled commercial, 32% general aviation, 29% air taxi, and <1% military. At that time there were 109 aircraft based at this airport: 61% multi-engine, 14% helicopter, 15% jet, and 10% single-engine. The FAA projects operations to increase to 334,279 by 2030, or 918.882 operations per day.

The airport also has a seaplane base adjacent to it, so that seaplanes and floatplanes can take off and land. The Lake Hood Seaplane Base, adjacent to Anchorage Airport, is the busiest seaplane base in the world.

Terminals

The South Terminal (domestic) serves Air Canada, Alaska Airlines, Allegiant Air, American Airlines, Condor (Departures), Delta Air Lines, Frontier Airlines, Sun Country, and United Airlines. All regional intrastate carriers also use the South Terminal.

The South terminal contains three concourses: Concourse A, Concourse B, and Concourse C. The area of what is today Concourse C stood the original airport terminal constructed in the 1950s. A hexagonal satellite terminal was constructed across the main structure shortly afterward. In 1969, the terminal underwent a major expansion, forming what is today Concourse B - notable new features included a curved arrival/departure structure with an elevated departure ramp for vehicles. The sweeping structure was designed to connect with the existing hexagonal satellite, now the end of Concourse B. In 1985, Concourse A was added. In 2009, this portion of the South terminal received seismic and aesthetic upgrades.

Concourse C was completely rebuilt in 2004, design by McCool Carlson Green Architects, while Concourses A and B were built in 1985 and 1969 respectively and renovated in 2009. Architects HNTB and RIM Architects performed the architectural work for A/B Concourse. The south terminal also contains two L gates, numbered L1 and L2. These gates are outside security on the lower level and adjacent to Concourse A.

The North Terminal (international) serves Condor (Arrivals), Japan Airlines, Korean Air, Yakutia Airlines, all international seasonal charter flights, and military flights. In addition to these airlines, a few cargo airlines use the north side of the terminal for parking while their aircraft have small problems that need maintenance for a day or so. This terminal was built in 1982.

Airlines and destinations

Passenger

Cargo

Statistics

Top destinations

Ground transport

Inter-terminal
A shuttle bus runs approximately every 15 minutes between the North and South terminals and the employee and long-term parking lots. A land-side inter-terminal walkway was completed in 2009. Air-side connections between the sterile areas of each terminal are not available.

To/from airport
Route 40 of the Anchorage People Mover bus system serves the airport's North and South terminals every 15 minutes from 6:00am to 7:30pm on weekdays and every 30 minutes until 2:00am, as well as service every 30 minutes all day on Saturday and Sunday, connecting it with the downtown Transit Center.

Taxi queues are available in front of each terminal. Courtesy vans and other ground transportation options pick up from designated areas in front of each terminal.

Major national rental car chains are represented in an on-site consolidated rental car facility attached to the South terminal.

There is a rail station for the Alaska Railroad. It is only available during the summer season for cruise ship service only. The depot opened in 2003, after funding was secured by United States Senator Ted Stevens, but commuter service never materialized.

Renovations
Renovations began on the A and B concourses in fall 2006. These renovations are designed to bring the older portions into compliance with current seismic, heating, ventilation, electrical and safety codes, and also include new baggage handling systems and renovations to the interior of the concourses. Since the completion of the construction, all domestic flights are operated out of the South Terminal.

Commissioned art pieces
Euphony, 2004: glass artist – Warren Carther

The piece consists of nine towers of glass, collectively adding up to 42 meters (130  ft) of span and reaching to 8 meters (26 ft) at its highest point. The series of panels are inspired by Alaska's immensely rugged landscape of glaciers and mountains. The ambiguous images embedded within the sculpture address Alaska's continual balancing of the forces of technology with the vast powers of the natural world.

On November 30, 2018, at 8:29 a.m. AKST (17:29 UTC) it was damaged in the 7.1 magnitude earthquake and repaired a few months later.
It was damaged again in 2020 by a disgruntled passenger of which still has yet to be repaired as of 2022.

Programs
The airport features an innovative customer service program, which partners with most on-site (and some nearby) vendors and concessionaires and aims to promote a positive image of the airport and the State of Alaska in the minds of travelers. This volunteer, self-funded committee mystery shops at partnering companies and provides awards of cash, free covered parking, and donated prizes to winning employees.

Accidents and incidents
 On October 1, 1970, Douglas R4D-6 N47 of the Federal Aviation Administration crashed shortly after take-off and was destroyed in the subsequent fire. The aircraft was operating a local training flight. Both crewmembers were killed.
 On November 27, 1970, Douglas DC-8-63 of Capitol Airlines crashed on takeoff from Anchorage, killing 47 of 229 passengers and crew on board, operating as Capitol Flight 3/26.
 On January 13, 1977, JAL Cargo Flight 8054, a McDonnell-Douglas DC-8-62F, crashed shortly after takeoff with a cargo of live beef cattle for delivery to Tokyo, Japan. The three crew members and the two cargo handlers aboard the aircraft died in the crash, and the aircraft was destroyed. The National Transportation Safety Board determined that the probable cause of the accident was a stall that resulted from the pilot's control inputs aggravated by airframe icing while the pilot was under the influence of alcohol.
 On December 4, 1978, a Learjet 25C en route from Juneau crashed upon landing. On board were Ann Stevens, wife of U.S. Senator Ted Stevens; lobbyist and former Alaska Commissioner of Commerce and Economic Development (and future U.S. Ambassador to Brazil) Langhorne A. Motley, prominent Anchorage lawyer Joseph Rudd, and three others. The party was traveling from the second-term inauguration of Alaska governor Jay Hammond to an Anchorage fundraiser organized by Motley. Motley and Ted Stevens were the only survivors.
 On June 8, 1983, Reeve Aleutian Airways Flight 8's propeller separated from the Lockheed L-188 Electra and tore a hole in the fuselage over the Pacific Ocean, causing explosive decompression and loss of control. The pilots managed to land the aircraft safely at Anchorage, and all 15 passengers and crew survived. Since the propeller fell into the sea the cause of the separation is undetermined.
 On December 23, 1983, the 1983 Anchorage runway collision occurred when Korean Air Lines Flight 084, a McDonnell Douglas DC-10 freighter bound for Los Angeles, attempted to take off on the wrong runway in dense fog, and collided with SouthCentral Air Flight 59, a Piper PA-31 waiting to take off in the opposite direction.  Both aircraft were destroyed, the three flightcrew of the DC-10 were seriously injured, and three of the nine occupants of the PA-31 sustained minor injuries, but no fatalities resulted.
On December 15, 1989, KLM Flight 867 entered a volcanic ash cloud after takeoff from ANC, created by an eruption from Mount Redoubt. The flight suffered a complete loss of engine power and returned to make an emergency landing at ANC. 
 On March 31, 1993, a Boeing 747-121, Japan Air Lines Flight 46E, operated by Evergreen International Airlines, departing Anchorage for Chicago, suffered a complete loss of the number 2 engine pylon at 2,000 ft after encountering severe-to-extreme turbulence after takeoff. The aircraft then experienced an uncommanded left bank of approximately 50 degrees. The flight crew successfully landed the aircraft back at Anchorage International, to discover the number 2 engine and all of the leading edge of the wing between the number 1 and 2 engines had been torn away.  The investigation found that the engine pylon had been weakened by metal fatigue cracking, which made the engine more susceptible to separation in severe turbulence.
 On October 9, 2002, a Boeing 747-451, Northwest Airlines Flight 85 en route from Detroit to Tokyo, suffered a lower rudder hard over. While flying over the Bering Sea, the aircraft abruptly went into a 35- through 40-degree left bank after the lower rudder had swung left 17° and hydraulic failure caused it to be stuck in place. Captain Frank Geib and First Officer Mike Fagan were at the controls at the time, having just taken over from Senior Captain John Hanson and First Officer David Smith. Geib declared an emergency and turned the aircraft back towards Anchorage. Hanson had returned to the cockpit and soon took over the controls. He and Fagan then flew the aircraft for over an hour before successfully landing in Anchorage. In order to steer the aircraft, they had to use asymmetric engine thrust or varying input into the engines as they were unable to use the ailerons at the time. No passengers or crew were injured, but the incident resulted in an airworthiness directive to prevent the possibility of a future accident.

Media appearances
The airport was the focus of a Smithsonian Channel miniseries Ice Airport Alaska that ran in late 2020. It has also been shown in the Discovery Channel series Deadliest Catch.

References

External links

 Ted Stevens Anchorage International Airport (official site)
 Bureau of Transportation Statistics
 FAA Terminal Area Forecast
 
 

 

 
1951 establishments in Alaska
Airports established in 1951
Airports in Anchorage, Alaska
Economy of Anchorage, Alaska